G21 may refer to:

 BMW 3 Series (G21), an automobile
 County Route G21 (California)
 Glock 21, a firearm
 Gribovsky G-21, a Soviet aircraft
 Grumman G-21 Goose, an American aircraft
 Ginetta G21, an automobile produced by Ginetta Cars
 G21 developing nations, a trade bloc also known as G20 developing nations